Visionarium may refer to:
Visionarium (Portugal), a science museum in Portugal.
The Timekeeper, a 1992 Circle-Vision 360° film.